The Bigger Man is a lost 1915 silent film drama directed by John W. Noble and starring Henry Kolker, a stage star.

Plot

Cast
Henry Kolker - John Stoddard
Renee Kelly - Janet Van Nest
Orlando Daly - Courtlandt Van Nest
Elsie Balfour - Edith Stoddard
J. H. Goldsworthy - Kenneth Stuyvesant
Mayme Kelso - Aunt Sarah
Edwin Boring - Lavinsky
Richard Lee - Sevic

References

External links

1915 films
American silent feature films
Lost American films
American films based on plays
Films based on works by Rupert Hughes
American black-and-white films
Silent American drama films
1915 drama films
Metro Pictures films
1915 lost films
Lost drama films
Films directed by John W. Noble
1910s American films